The 2003 ICF Canoe Slalom World Championships were held in Augsburg, Germany under the auspices of International Canoe Federation for the record-tying third time. It was the 28th edition. Augsburg hosted the championships previously in 1957 and 1985 when the city was part of West Germany, and matches the times hosted by Spittal, Austria (1963, 1965, 1977), Meran, Italy (1953, 1971, 1983), and Bourg St.-Maurice, France (1969, 1987, 2002).

Competitions were held at the Augsburg Eiskanal facility which was built for the 1972 Summer Olympics.

Medal summary

Men's

Canoe

Kayak

Women's

Kayak

Medal table

References
Official results
International Canoe Federation

Canoe Slalom World Championships
World Canoe Slalom Championships
ICF Canoe Slalom World Championships
International sports competitions hosted by Germany
Canoeing and kayaking competitions in Germany
2000s in Bavaria